Higlett may refer to:

Amber Higlett An Australian television reporter.
George Higlett A philatelist.